Meyer is a masculine given name. People with the name include:

Meyer (footballer), Meyer Carlos de Camargo, Júnior (born 1980), Brazilian football player
Meyer Alterman (1891–1967), New York assemblyman
Meyer R. Bimberg (died 1908), American businessman
Meyer Cardin (1907–2005), American jurist and politician
 Meyer Cohen, known as Mickey Cohen (1913–1976), American gangster, boxer and entrepreneur 
Meyer Dolinsky (1923–1984), American screenwriter
Meyer Fortes (1906–1983), South African-born anthropologist
Meyer Fürth, German teacher and writer
Meyer Guggenheim (1828–1905), American businessman
Meyer Habib (born 1961), Tunisian-Jewish French-Israeli politician 
Meyer Justin Herman (1909–1971), American public administrator, active in San Francisco
Meyer Lansky (1902–1983), American gangster
Meyer Levin (1905–1981), American novelist
Meyer Levin (military) (1916–1943), American aviator
Meyer London (1871–1926), American politician
Meyer Lutz (1829–1903), German-born British composer and conductor 
Meyer Francis Nimkoff (1904–1965), American sociologist
Meyer Rosenbaum (I) (1852–1908), Kretchnifer Rebbe
Meyer Rosenbaum (II) (1910–death year unknown), self-proclaimed Chief Rabbi of Cuba 
Meyer Rubin (1924–2020), American geologist 
Meyer Schapiro (1904–1996), Lithuanian-born American art historian 
Meyer Shapiro, multiple people
Meyer Wolf Weisgal (1894–1977), American journalist, publisher, and playwright
Meyer Wolfe (1897–1985), American sculptor.
Meyer Zayder (died 1930), Soviet military figure

Fictional characters
Meyer Wolfsheim, from The Great Gatsby by F. Scott Fitzgerald
Meyer Meyer, from the 87th Precinct series by Ed McBain

See also
 Meyer (surname), list of people with the surname version
 Meyer, disambiguation pager

Jewish masculine given names
Masculine given names